Odus Evbagharu is an American politician. He is the chair of the Harris County Democratic Party in Houston, Texas. Evbagharu also serves as Chief of Staff for Texas State Representative Jon Rosenthal.

County Democratic Chairman
On June 27, 2021, Evbagharu was elected Chairman of the Democratic Party in Harris County, Texas — the third largest county in the U.S. He is the youngest and the first Black chair of the Harris County Democratic Party (HCDP).  Evbagharu replaced Lillie Schechter, who served as HCDP Chair between 2017 and 2021.

Background
Evbagharu was born in London, England, to Nigerian-born parents, Felix and Patience Evbagharu. He has one sister and one brother. Evbagharu moved to America with his family when he was five years old and Houston when he was 10. Evbagharu became a U.S. citizen in 2005.
In Houston, Evbagharu grew up in the suburbs of Cypress and attended school in the Cypress-Fairbanks Independent School District. He attended the University of Houston and earned a Bachelor of Science degree in political science in 2018.

Political life 
Evbagharu worked for the Harris County Democratic Party between 2017 and 2018, first as a Communications Fellow, then as Communications Director and Candidate Coordinator. He was the campaign manager for Eliz Markowitz in her 2019-2020 special election race for Texas House District 28.
Evbagharu joined Texas Rep. Jon Rosenthal’s team as political director in January 2018 and in November of that year became Rosenthal’s Chief of Staff.  
Evbagharu serves on the board of directors for the Texas Freedom Network, on the steering committee for Planned Parenthood Young Leaders, and was formerly a board member of the New Leaders Council.

References 

1991 births
University of Houston alumni
Living people
People from Harris County, Texas
Texas Democrats